was a Japanese businessman, author and pseudoscientist who claimed that human consciousness could affect the molecular structure of water. His 2004 book The Hidden Messages in Water was a New York Times best seller. His conjecture evolved over the years, and his early work revolved around pseudoscientific hypotheses that water could react to positive thoughts and words and that polluted water could be cleaned through prayer and positive visualization.

From 1999, Emoto published several volumes of a work entitled Messages from Water, containing photographs of ice crystals and accompanying experiments such as that of the ‘rice in water’ 30 day experiment.

Biography
Emoto was born in Yokohama, Japan, and graduated from Yokohama Municipal University after taking courses in International Relations. He worked in the Nagoya Office (Central Japan Office) of the Yomiuri Shimbun, then founded the International Health Medical company in 1986. In 1989, he received exclusive rights to market the Magnetic Resonance Analyzer, a device patented by Ronald Weinstock (USP 5,592,086), which was alleged to be able to detect the magnetic field around a human hair, for example, and diagnose almost any disease. He renamed it the "Vibration-o-Meter," became an operator himself, and started a business dealing in vibrations.

He was President Emeritus of the International Water For Life Foundation, a non-profit organization based in Oklahoma City in the United States. In 1992, he became a Doctor of Alternative Medicine at the Open International University for Alternative Medicine in India, a diploma mill which targeted quacks to sell its degrees and was later shut down.

Ideas
Emoto claimed that water was a "blueprint for our reality" and that emotional "energies" and "vibrations" could change its physical structure. His water crystal experiments consisted of exposing water in glasses to various words, pictures, or music, then freezing it and examining the ice crystals' aesthetic properties with microscopic photography. He claimed that water exposed to positive speech and thoughts created visually "pleasing" ice crystals, and that negative intentions yielded "ugly" ice formations.

Emoto held that different water sources produced different ice structures. For example, he held that water from a mountain stream, when frozen, showed structures of beautifully shaped geometric designs; but that water from polluted sources created distorted, randomly formed ice structures. He held that these changes could be eliminated by exposing water to ultraviolet light or certain electromagnetic waves.

In 2008, Emoto published his findings in the Journal of Scientific Exploration, a journal of the Society for Scientific Exploration that has been criticized for catering to fringe science. He co-conducted and co-authored the work with Takashige Kizu of Emoto's own IHM General Institute, and Dean Radin and Nancy Lund of the Institute of Noetic Sciences, which is on Stephen Barrett's Quackwatch list of questionable organizations.

Reception
Commentators have criticized Emoto for insufficient experimental controls and for not sharing enough details of his experiments with the scientific community. He has also been criticized for designing his experiments in ways that permit manipulation or human error. Biochemist and Director of Microscopy at University College Cork William Reville wrote, "It is very unlikely that there is any reality behind Emoto's claims." Reville noted the lack of scientific publication and pointed out that anyone who could demonstrate such phenomena would become immediately famous and probably wealthy.

Writing about Emoto's ideas in the Skeptical Inquirer, physician Harriet A. Hall concluded that it was "hard to see how anyone could mistake it for science". In 2003, James Randi published an invitation on his website, offering Emoto to take the One Million Dollar Paranormal Challenge, in which Emoto could have received US$1,000,000 if he had been able to reproduce the experiment under test conditions agreed to by both parties. Randi did not receive a response.

Emoto's book The Hidden Messages in Water was a New York Times best seller. Writing in The New York Times Book Review, literary critic Dwight Garner  described it as "spectacularly eccentric", and said its success was "one of those 'head-scratchers' that makes me question the sanity of the reading public."  Publishers Weekly described Emoto's later work, The Shape of Love, as "mostly incoherent and unsatisfying".

Emoto's ideas appeared in the movies Kamen Rider: The First and What the Bleep Do We Know!?.

Publications

Books
 
 English edition: 
 
 English edition: 
 
 English edition: 
 
 
 English edition: 
 
 The True Power of Water (Book): Healing and Discovering Ourselves; Beyond Words Pub, 2005. .
 The Hidden Messages in Water; Beyond Words Pub, 2004.

See also
 Water memory
 Polywater
 Water (2006 film)
 Pseudoscience

References

Further reading

External links
 
 
 

1943 births
2014 deaths
People from Yokohama
Japanese writers
Japanese activists
New Age writers
Pseudoscientific physicists
Parapsychologists
Quantum mysticism advocates